Thanu Nenu is a 2015 Indian Telugu-language romance film directed by writer Ram Mohan P. (in his directorial debut) and starring Santosh Sobhan and Avika Gor. The title of the film is based on a song from Sahasam Swasaga Sagipo (2016).

Plot

Cast 
Santosh Sobhan as Kiran
Avika Gor as Keerthi
Ravi Babu as Keerthi's father
Satya Krishnan as Keerthi's mother
 Rohit Varma as an NRI
 Naresh as Kiran's friend
 Kireeti Damaraju
 RK

Soundtrack 
Songs by Sunny M.R.
"Pade Pade" - Aditya, Harshika Gudi
"Tanu Nenu" - Anudeep Dev, Harshika Gudi
"Nuvvu Todu Unte" - Arijit Singh
"Suryudne Chusodamma" - Arijit Singh, Harshika Gudi, Sunny M.R.
"Adigo Idigo" - Sunny M.R.

Reception 
Y. Sunita Chowdhary of The Hindu gave a mixed review and called the film "painfully slow". A critic from The Times of India gave the film a rating of two out of five stars and wrote that "There’s not much of commercial masala for the audiences who love such stuff, so this film may not be their cup of tea". A critic from 123Telugu gave the film a rating of three out of five and said that "On the whole, Tanu Nenu is a quirky love story which will appeal to the youth and multiplex audience mostly". Suresh Kavirayani of Deccan Chronicle called the film a "one time watch".

References

External links 

2015 films
2010s Telugu-language films
Indian romance films